Theresa Schuessler (born September 25, 1994) is an American professional wrestler. She is currently signed to WWE performing under the ring name Fallon Henley on the NXT brand and currently is one-half of the NXT Women's Tag Team Champions with Kiana James in their first reign.

Professional wrestling career 
She made her in-ring debut on June 24, 2017 under the name Tesha Price. On December 16, 2017, she made her Shine Wrestling debut at Shine 47, competing in a battle royal to determine the #1 contender for the Shine Championship, which was won by Rain. Later that night, she also competed in a 4-way match against Dynamite DiDi, Kikyo, and Robyn Reid, which would be won by DiDi. She appeared on the July 25 episode of NXT under the name Tenilla Price, losing to Lacey Evans. On August 8, now back under the name Tesha Price, she lost to Britt Baker in a dark match held during the second annual Mae Young Classic. She made her All Elite Wrestling debut on the November 6, 2020 episode of AEW Dark in a match against Big Swole, which she lost. She made her Dynamite debut on December 9, where she lost to Abadon. In 2021, she returned to WWE under the name of Fallon Henley during Joe Gacy's invitation for NXT wrestlers, and faced Gacy that night, before being interrupted by Diamond Mine. At NXT Vengeance Day, Henley and Kiana James defeated Katana Chance and Kayden Carter to win the NXT Women's Tag Team Championship, the first title in her wrestling career.

Championships and accomplishments 
WWE
 NXT Women's Tag Team Championship (1 time, current) – with Kiana James

References

External links 
 
 
 
 

1994 births
Living people
American female professional wrestlers
Professional wrestlers from Florida
21st-century American women
21st-century professional wrestlers
NXT Women's Tag Team Champions